Bishopville is an unincorporated community in Morgan County and Athens County, Ohio, United States.
Bishopville is located near Burr Oak State Park.

History
Bishopville was laid out in 1859 by James M. Bishop, and named for him. A post office was established at Bishopville in 1860, and remained in operation until 1929.

References

Unincorporated communities in Morgan County, Ohio
Unincorporated communities in Ohio
1859 establishments in Ohio